Jorge Alberto da Costa Silva known as Jorjão or sometimes Jorgeao (literally Big Jorge) (born 31 December 1970) is a former Brazilian footballer.

Biography
Jorge started his professional career at Coritiba, and played for Coritiba at 1990, 1991 Copa do Brasil and 1993 Campeonato Brasileiro Série A. After Coritiba relegated, he spent next Campeonato Brasileiro season at Portuguesa. He then left for Ibero-America clubs and settled in Uruguay.

He played for 1997 Copa CONMEBOL for Deportes Tolima, 1999 Copa Libertadores and 2001 Copa Mercosur for Nacional. He played 46 league matches and scored 2 goals in 2000 and 2001 seasons.

In 2002, he left for China, and known as 曉曉. In January 2003, his contract was extended.

He then returned to play for amateur side Jandaia Esporte Clube.

Palmares

References

External links
 Profile at futpedia.globo.com 
 Profile at BDFA 
 CBF Contract Record 
 Profile at tenfieldigital.com.uy 

1970 births
Living people
Brazilian footballers
Brazilian expatriate footballers
Campeonato Brasileiro Série A players
Coritiba Foot Ball Club players
Grêmio Foot-Ball Porto Alegrense players
Associação Portuguesa de Desportos players
Defensor Sporting players
C.D. Veracruz footballers
Deportes Tolima footballers
Club Nacional de Football players
Tianjin Jinmen Tiger F.C. players
Wuhan Guanggu players
Expatriate footballers in Uruguay
Expatriate footballers in Mexico
Expatriate footballers in Colombia
Expatriate footballers in China
Brazilian expatriate sportspeople in Uruguay
Brazilian expatriate sportspeople in Mexico
Brazilian expatriate sportspeople in Colombia
Brazilian expatriate sportspeople in China
Association football central defenders
Footballers from São Paulo (state)